FedExPark is a baseball stadium in Memphis, Tennessee.  It is the home field of the Memphis Tigers baseball team.  The stadium holds 2,000 spectators and opened in 1972 as Nat Buring Stadium.

The stadium was renovated and expanded in 2009, at a cost of $3 million; the Tigers played the 2009 season at USA Stadium in Millington. The stadium was reopened on February 19, 2010, as FedExPark.

See also
 List of NCAA Division I baseball venues

References

External links
Venue information
Gift From FedEx Will Redesign Tiger Baseball Stadium

College baseball venues in the United States
Sports venues in Memphis, Tennessee
Baseball venues in Tennessee
Memphis Tigers baseball